The Ezra Hospital is a part of Medical College Kolkata.

History
The Ezra Hospital was built through the munificence of Mrs. Mozelle E. D. J. Ezra. It was inaugurated in 1887 but patients were admitted from 9 April 1888. Initially, it was meant for the Jewish population of the city.

Departments
At present, the Ezra Hospital houses the following departments of Calcutta Medical College:
Department of ENT
Department of Psychiatry
Department of Chest medicine (Pulmonology)
DOTS clinic
Apex Referral Center for HIV/AIDS, the outdoor department where HIV and AIDS patients are referred from all over West Bengal.

Citations

Hospital buildings completed in 1887
Medical College and Hospital, Kolkata
Hospitals established in 1887
Hospitals in Kolkata
Jews and Judaism in Kolkata
1887 establishments in British India